Sir Thomas Biggs, 1st Baronet (c. 1577 – 11 June 1621), was an English politician.

Biggs was the son of Sir Thomas Biggs, of Lenchwick, Worcestershire, by Ursula Throckmorton, daughter of Clement Throckmorton, of Haseley, Warwickshire. He was educated at Queen's College, Oxford.

He represented Evesham in Parliament in 1614 and again in 1621. In 1620 he was created a baronet, of Lenchwick in the County of Worcester. He sold the family estates at Lenchwick and Norton to Lord Craven.

Bigg married Anne Witham, daughter of William Witham, of Leadstone (Ledston), Yorkshire. They had no children. He died in June 1621 when the baronetcy became extinct. Lady Bigg married as her second husband Sir John Walter.

References

1621 deaths
Alumni of The Queen's College, Oxford
Baronets in the Baronetage of England
1570s births
English MPs 1614
English MPs 1621–1622